Rosemary Theresa Coogan (born 1991) is an astrophysicist from Northern Ireland. Her research considers galaxy evolution and space-based telescopes. She was selected as a member of the 2022 European Space Agency Astronaut Group.

Early life and education 
Coogan attended Brighton & Hove High School, now Brighton Girls. She was involved with military training from a young age. She was trained as a petty officer with the Sea Cadets. In 2009 she joined HMS Calliope and HMS Example, where she was made an Officer cadet. She was promoted to Midshipman of the Royal Naval Reserve.

Coogan studied physics and mathematics at Durham University. She remained in Durham for her master's research, where she studied gamma-ray astronomy with Paula Chadwick. Her research involved observations using the Fermi Gamma-ray Space Telescope to study the 0.1 < Eγ < 300 GeV gamma-ray emission of radio quasars. Coogan also worked on data science during a work placement at Senseye. She worked as a simulation support engineer to develop machine learning models to detect anomalies from robotic sensors.

Coogan moved to the University of Sussex as a doctoral researcher, studying galaxy evolution and the activity of active galactic nuclei. She found that dense cluster environment increases the star formation efficiency, which she attributed to the high number of mergers, interactions and the active galactic nuclei. Toward the end of her doctorate, she attempted to inform future observations by constructing mock images of survey fields for the Square Kilometre Array.

Career 
Coogan moved to the Max Planck Institute for Extraterrestrial Physics. In Germany, Coogan studied galaxy evolution with space-based telescopes. In 2022, Coogan was appointed to the CNES, where she works on Euclid and James Webb Space Telescope.

In 2022, Coogan was selected by the European Astronaut Corps to join the European Space Agency Astronaut Group. She said that she applied to the space program because she wanted to get "hands-on" with contributing the most that we can from space.

Selected publications

References 

1991 births
Living people
Alumni of the University of Sussex
Alumni of Durham University
Astrophysicists
Women astrophysicists